Veshnyaki is a rural locality (a village) in Nikolo-Ramenskoye Rural Settlement, Cherepovetsky District, Vologda Oblast, Russia. The population was 98 as of 2002.

Geography 
Veshnyaki is located 87 km southwest of Cherepovets (the district's administrative centre) by road. Kharlamovskaya is the nearest rural locality.

References 

Rural localities in Cherepovetsky District